Hanksite is a sulfate mineral, distinguished as one of only a handful that contain both carbonate and sulfate ion groups. It has the chemical formula Na22K(SO4)9(CO3)2Cl.

Occurrence
It was first described in 1888 for an occurrence in Searles Lake, California, and named for American geologist Henry Garber Hanks. Hanksite is normally found in crystal form as evaporite deposits. Hanksite crystals are large but not complex in structure. It is often found in Searles Lake, Soda Lake, Mono Lake, and in Death Valley. At its deposits in San Bernardino County, California hanksite is commonly found beneath the surface embedded in mud or in drill cores (Palache et al., 1960). It is associated with halite, borax, trona and aphthitalite at the Searles Lake locality. It is also associated with borax mining in the Soda Lake area.

Physical characteristics
Hanksite can be colorless, white, gray, green or yellow and is transparent or translucent. The mineral's hardness is approximately 3 to 3.5. The specific gravity is approximately 2.5 (slightly below average). It is salty to the taste and sometimes glows pale yellow in ultraviolet light. Typical growth habits are hexagonal prisms or tabular with pyramidal terminations.  The streak of Hanksite is white. It can contain inclusions of clay that the crystal formed around while developing.

Similar minerals

 Halite
 Borax
 Trona
 Nahcolite
 Tincalconite

References

Bibliography
Palache, P.; Berman H.; Frondel, C. (1960). "Dana's System of Mineralogy, Volume II: Halides, Nitrates, Borates, Carbonates, Sulfates, Phosphates, Arsenates, Tungstates, Molybdates, Etc. (Seventh Edition)" John Wiley and Sons, Inc., New York, pp. 628-629.

Sodium minerals
Sulfate minerals
Carbonate minerals
Halide minerals
Hexagonal minerals
Minerals in space group 176
Evaporite
Minerals described in 1888